Rickey A. Walcott (born. c.1982 in Barbados) is a jockey in Thoroughbred horse racing who competes in his homeland and in Canada.

Walcott won the 2003 Canadian Derby at Northlands Park in Edmonton, Alberta and was the top rider there for the 2007 summer meet and the season overall. Also a leading jockey at Stampede Park Racetrack in Calgary, he captured his first Alberta riding title in 2007.

References
 March 2007 Caribzones.com article on Rickey Walcott winning the Barbados Gold Cup 
 25 March 2008 article in Hoofprints on Rickey Walcott 

1981 births
Living people
Year of birth uncertain
Barbadian jockeys
Canadian jockeys